Sambo Choji (born 13 March 1977 in Benin City) is a Nigerian former football striker. Choji was an integral member of the Nigeria national Under-17 team, the golden eaglets that won the Fifa World Under-17 championship in 1993 in Tokyo, Japan. He played all games operating in the left flank as Nigeria beat title holders, Ghana, to be crowned champions a second time.
He is currently retired and residing in his home city of Jos, in Plateau State, North-Central Nigeria where he has been developing future football talents.

Choji has played for Plateau United fc of Jos,1. FC Saarbrücken and Eintracht Braunschweig in the German 2. Bundesliga.

References

1977 births
Living people
Nigerian footballers
Nigerian expatriate footballers
Sportspeople from Benin City
1. FC Saarbrücken players
Eintracht Braunschweig players
Persepolis F.C. players
Expatriate footballers in Iran
Plateau United F.C. players
Mighty Jets F.C. players
2. Bundesliga players
Association football forwards